Pultenaea dargilensis is a species of flowering plant in the family Fabaceae and is endemic to a small area in central Victoria, Australia. It is a leaning or low-lying shrub with narrow elliptic to lance-shaped leaves and yellow flowers usually arranged singly on the ends of branchlets.

Description
Flowering occurs from October to November.

Taxonomy and naming
Pultenaea dargilensis was first formally described in 2009 by Margaret Corrick and Neville Walsh in the journal Muelleria from specimens collected by Corrick near Heathcote in 2001. The specific epithet (dargilensis) refers to the Dargile Forest where this species was discovered.

Distribution and habitat
This pultenaea usually grows in forest in the Heathcote-Graytown National Park in central Victoria.

References

dargilensis
Flora of Victoria (Australia)
Plants described in 2009